Charles Judson Child Jr. (April 25, 1923 – January 5, 2004) was the seventh bishop of the Episcopal Diocese of Atlanta. He was consecrated as Bishop Suffragan in 1978, and served as diocesan bishop from 1983 to 1989.

Early life
Judson Child was born on April 25, 1923, in North Bergen, New Jersey.  In 1944, he graduated from the University of the South in Sewanee, Tennessee. He later attended the School of Theology at the same institution and, in 1947, received his Master of Divinity.

Career
On February 2, 1947, Child was ordained as a deacon by Benjamin M. Washburn, Bishop of Newark, New Jersey.  On March 1, 1948, Washburn ordained Child as a priest. From 1947 to 1951, Child served as assistant to the rector of St Paul's Church, Paterson, New Jersey. In 1951, he became rector of St Bartholomew's Church, Ho-Ho-Kus, New Jersey.

In 1967, having served sixteen years in Ho-Ho-Kus, Child took a post as Canon Pastor at St. Philip's Cathedral in Atlanta, Georgia. In 1978, he was elected Bishop Suffragan, serving with Bennett Sims. Upon Sims' retirement, Child was elected diocesan bishop. He was installed in 1983 and retired in 1989. Renowned for his quick wit, open heart, and grand sense of humor, Child continued to be well loved and active in the diocese well after his retirement until his death on January 5, 2004.

Consecrators
 John Allin, 23rd Presiding Bishop of the Episcopal Church
 Bennett Sims, 6th Bishop of Atlanta
 Randolph Claiborne, 5th Bishop of Atlanta

C. Judson Child was the 723rd bishop consecrated in the Episcopal Church.

See also

 List of Bishop Succession in the Episcopal Church

References

 Atlanta Diocese Centennial History page on Child.
 The Episcopal Church Annual. Morehouse Publishing: New York, NY (2005).

Episcopal bishops of Atlanta
1923 births
2004 deaths
Sewanee: The University of the South alumni
American religious leaders
People from North Bergen, New Jersey
20th-century American Episcopalians